Kuybyshevsky District is an administrative and municipal district (raion), one of the twenty-four in Kaluga Oblast, Russia. It is located in the west of the oblast. Its administrative center is the rural locality (a settlement) of Betlitsa. Population:  The population of Betlitsa accounts for 53.1% of the district's population.

References

Notes

Sources

Districts of Kaluga Oblast